Dominique Faure (born 28 August 1959) is a French politician of the Radical Party who has been serving as State Secretary for Rural Affairs in the government of Prime Minister Élisabeth Borne since 2022. She was elected to the National Assembly in the 2022 French legislative election in Haute-Garonne's 10th constituency.

Early life and career
Faure holds an engineering degree from INSA de Lyon and an MBA from HEC Paris. 

Following graduation, Faure worked in major companies – IBM, Motorola, SFR, Veolia – and ran a human resources consulting firm before entering politics in the 2012 legislative elections. Together with her husband, she also owns a hotel.

Political career
From 2014 to 2022, Faure served as mayor of Saint-Orens-de-Gameville.

Personal life
Faure is married and has three children.

References 

1959 births
Living people
21st-century French women politicians
Radical Party (France) politicians
Women government ministers of France
Deputies of the 16th National Assembly of the French Fifth Republic
Women members of the National Assembly (France)
Members of the Borne government
Politicians from Occitania (administrative region)
People from Carcassonne
French women engineers